Homalocephale (from Greek ὁμαλός, homalos, "even", and κεφαλή, kephalē, "head") is a genus of pachycephalosaurid dinosaur that lived during the Late Cretaceous period of what is now the Nemegt Formation, Mongolia, about 70 million years ago. The genus was described in 1974 by Halszka Osmólska and Teresa Maryańska, and consists of a single species, H. calathocercos. Though Homalocephale has been regarded as a synonym (and juvenile form) of Prenocephale, juvenile specimens of the latter indicate that they were distinct.

Discovery

The type species, H. calathocercos, was described from an incomplete skull and postcranial material (holotype MPC-D 100/1201) from the Nemegt locality of the Nemegt Formation. The specimen has large openings on the top of the skull, a distinct frontoparietal suture, low and long infratemporal fenestrae, and a large, round eye socket. The forehead is notably rough, with multiple nodules on the lateral and posterior sides of the squamosal bone. Paleontologists concluded that the specimen was an adult, despite the fact that the sutures are discernible and that it had a flat skull (a juvenile trait in many pachycephalosaurid species).

In 2010, a study by Nick Longrich and colleagues suggested that flat-headed pachycephalosaurs were just juvenile forms of dome-headed adults, a view also supported by the earlier analysis of Horner and Goodwin in 2009. Longrich and colleagues suggested that Homalocephale is actually the juvenile or sub-adult stage of Prenocephale mainly based on the lack of a dome and being discovered in the same locality (Nemegt) as the latter.

David C. Evans and team in 2018 reported juvenile specimens of Prenocephale from the Nemegt Formation, noting a relatively linear growth in this pachycephalosaur characterized by a rounded dome. This differs from the flat skull of Homalocephale and given that even juvenile Prenocephale possessed a rather rounded dome, both taxa should be regarded as separate.

Description

Unlike other definitely adult pachycephalosaurs (though similar to probable juvenile specimens referred to Dracorex and Goyocephale), Homalocephale sported a flat, wedge-shaped skull roof. Nonetheless, the surface of the skull was fairly thickened.

Paleobiology
Homalocephale is also noted for having an unusually broad pelvis, which lead some paleontologists to suggest that the wide hips were for giving birth to live young. Others have suggested that the width served to protect vital organs from harm during flank-butting. Homalocephale also had rather long legs, indicating a fast-moving gait.

See also
 Timeline of pachycephalosaur research

References

Fantastic Facts About Dinosaurs

External links

 https://web.archive.org/web/20061006225059/http://www.dino-nakasato.org/en/special97/Homa-e.html
 https://web.archive.org/web/20070518001124/http://www.leute.server.de/frankmuster/H/Homalocephale.htm

Pachycephalosaurs
Late Cretaceous dinosaurs of Asia
Maastrichtian life
Nemegt fauna
Fossil taxa described in 1974
Taxa named by Teresa Maryańska
Taxa named by Halszka Osmólska
Ornithischian genera